Filiph Engsund (born 3 August 1993) is a Swedish professional ice hockey player. He currently plays for Södertälje SK in the HockeyAllsvenskan (Allsv). He formerly played in the Swedish Hockey League (SHL) with IK Oskarshamn and Djurgårdens IF.

References

External links

1993 births
Living people
Djurgårdens IF Hockey players
IK Oskarshamn players
Södertälje SK players
Swedish ice hockey goaltenders
Västerviks IK players
Ice hockey people from Gothenburg